Rho GTPase activating protein 25 is a protein that in humans is encoded by the ARHGAP25 gene. The gene is also known as KAIA0053. ARHGAP25 belongs to a family of Rho GTPase-modulating proteins that are implicated in actin remodeling, cell polarity, and cell migration.

Model organisms 

Model organisms have been used in the study of ARHGAP25 function. A conditional knockout mouse line, called Arhgap25tm1a(KOMP)Wtsi was generated as part of the International Knockout Mouse Consortium program — a high-throughput mutagenesis project to generate and distribute animal models of disease to interested scientists.

Male and female animals underwent a standardized phenotypic screen to determine the effects of deletion. Twenty-one tests were carried out on homozygous-mutant mice and one significant abnormality was observed: abnormal retina morphology and pigmentation.

References

Further reading 
 
 
 

Human proteins
Genes mutated in mice